The 1922 UCI Road World Championships was the second edition of the UCI Road World Championships, the annual world championships for road bicycle racing. The championships took place in Liverpool, United Kingdom on 3 August 1922.

In the men's amateur championship, Great Britain swept the podium with David Marsh taking home the gold medal with fellow British riders in Bill Burkill and Charles Davey claiming the silver and bronze medal respectively.

Events summary

Medal table

Results

See also
 1922 UCI Track Cycling World Championships

References

UCI Road World Championships by year
W
R
R
International sports competitions in Liverpool
1920s in Liverpool
August 1922 sports events